13th London Film Critics Circle Awards
1993

Film of the Year: 
 Unforgiven 

British Film of the Year: 
 Howards End 

The 13th London Film Critics Circle Awards, honouring the best in film for 1992, were announced by the London Film Critics Circle in 1993.

Winners
Film of the Year
Unforgiven

British Film of the Year
Howards End

Foreign Language Film of the Year
Raise the Red Lantern • China/Hong Kong/Taiwan

Director of the Year
Robert Altman – The Player

British Director of the Year
Neil Jordan – The Crying Game

Screenwriter of the Year
Michael Tolkin – The Player

British Screenwriter of the Year
Neil Jordan – The Crying Game

Actor of the Year
Robert Downey Jr. – Chaplin

Actress of the Year
Judy Davis – Husbands and Wives, Barton Fink  and Naked Lunch

British Actor of the Year
Daniel Day-Lewis – The Last of the Mohicans

Newcomer of the Year
Baz Luhrmann – Strictly Ballroom

British Newcomer of the Year
Peter Chelsom – Hear My Song

British Technical Achievement of the Year
Roger Deakins – Barton Fink

British Producer of the Year
Stephen Woolley – The Crying Game

Special Achievement Award
Freddie Francis

Dilys Powell Award
Freddie Young

External links
IMDB
Official Website

1
1992 film awards
1992 in London
1992 in British cinema